National University of Vanuatu (NUV) was established by the Parliament on the 17th December 2019 via Act No. 34 of 2019. 

It incorporates the Vanuatu Institute of Teacher Education (VITE), Vanuatu Institute of Technology, Vanuatu Agriculture College, Vanuatu Maritime College, Vanuatu Nursing College, and Vanuatu Police College.

Former education minister, Jean Pierre Nirua, has been appointed as the inaugural vice-chancellor.

See also
 List of universities in Polynesia

References
 

Universities and colleges in Vanuatu
Port Vila